Kathleen Anne McGrath (June 4, 1952 – September 26, 2002) was the first woman to command a United States Navy warship.

Early life 
On June 4, 1952, McGrath was born in Columbus, Ohio. McGrath's father is Colonel James H. McGrath. McGrath's mother is Martha McGrath.

Education 
In 1975, McGrath earned a Bachelor of Science degree in Environmental Science from California State University, Sacramento. McGrath attended Officer Candidate School in Rhode Island. In 1987, McGrath earned a Master of Arts degree in Educational Management from Stanford University.

Career 
McGrath worked in the United States Forestry Service until 1980 when she joined the US Navy. McGrath was deployed to the Western Pacific, the Persian Gulf and the Mediterranean and Caribbean seas.

McGrath commanded the rescue and salvage ship USS Recovery in 1993 and 1994.  She was the first woman to command was US Navy ship.

In December 1998, Captain McGrath became commander of the frigate USS Jarrett. She was one of the group of five women, including Michelle J. Howard, Maureen Farren, Ann O'Connor, and Grace Mehl, chosen to be the first female combatant commanders in the United States Navy.

In the spring of 2000, it was just six years after Congress revoked rules prohibiting women from serving on combat aircraft and warships. On March 31, 2000, McGrath commanded USS Jarrett and set to sea from San Diego, California with a destination of the Persian Gulf region. Its goal was to hunt boats suspected of smuggling Iraqi oil in violation of United Nations sanctions.

In May 2002, McGrath was promoted to the rank of captain.

Following her tour as commander of the Jarrett, McGrath served at the Joint Advanced Warfighting Unit in Alexandria, Virginia.

Captain McGrath died in September 2002 at the age of 50.

Awards
 Legion of Merit
 Meritorious Service Medal with three gold stars (4 awards)
 Navy Commendation Medal with 2 gold stars
 Navy Achievement Medal
 Joint Meritorious Unit Award
 Meritorious Unit Citation
 Navy E Ribbon
 National Defense Service Medal with star
 Armed Forces Expeditionary Medal
 Southwest Asia Service Medal with star
 Sea Service Deployment Ribbon
 Navy Overseas Service Ribbon
 Kuwait Liberation Medal

Personal life 
McGrath's husband was Gregory H. Brandon. They have two children.

On September 26, 2002, McGrath died from lung cancer at the National Naval Medical Center in Bethesda, Maryland. She was 50 years old. McGrath is buried in Arlington National Cemetery.

References

External links
 Navy Mourns Passing of Pioneer

United States Navy captains
1952 births
2002 deaths
California State University, Sacramento alumni
Female United States Navy officers
Burials at Arlington National Cemetery
Recipients of the Legion of Merit
Stanford University alumni
Women in 21st-century warfare
20th-century American women
20th-century American people
 Deaths from cancer in Maryland